Chris Murray (born September 26, 1966) is a Canadian-singer-songwriter and guitarist working primarily in the genre of ska. In Canada, he was a member of the now-defunct ska band King Apparatus during the late 1980s and early 1990s. He now lives in the Los Angeles, California area, where he performs regularly, both solo as well as with the Chris Murray Combo. From 2003 until the venue's closure in 2009, Murray organized a weekly ska/reggae show called "The Bluebeat Lounge" which featured both local and out of town artists every Wednesday at the Knitting Factory in Hollywood.

Murray recorded Slackness, a collaboration with the seminal New York City ska band The Slackers. The 11-song album features Murray singing lead vocals on new arrangements of his solo material, as well as some entirely new songs and a cover of The Clash's "Janie Jones".

Murray has performed throughout North America, Europe, Japan, Korea, and South America, sharing the stage with acts including The Specials, The Slackers and Laurel Aitken. He is known for the informal atmosphere of his live shows, during which his set list is determined almost exclusively by live requests from audience members.

Murray has released three CDs on the Asian Man Records label: 4-Trackaganza!, Raw, and 4-Track Adventures of Venice Shoreline Chris. His CDs are often recorded with a four-track tape recorder, giving a distinctly low fidelity sound. Raw is especially lo-fi, as it was recorded on a hand-held walkman. In late 2009, it was announced that Chris Murray had signed to Sonic Boom Six's Rebel Alliance record label for the UK.

References

External links
 Chris Murray official site
 Chris Murray audio and video
 Chris Murray on CBC Radio3
 Chris Murray's page from Asian Man Records site
 The Ruckus – Audio Interview with Chris Murray from March 2009

Interviews
 Interview with Chris Murray
 Interview with Chris Murray from Ska Blah Blah (2006)

1966 births
Living people
Canadian ska music
Canadian rock singers
Canadian male singers
Canadian singer-songwriters
Canadian rock guitarists
Canadian male guitarists
Canadian expatriate musicians in the United States
Musicians from Toronto
Canadian male singer-songwriters